The Wee Jasper Nature Reserve is a protected nature reserve that is located in the Southern Tablelands region of New South Wales, in eastern Australia.

Features 

Flora
Four distinct forest ecosystems exist in the reserve:
 Apple box - Norton's box moist grass forestThis ecosystem exists on south east facing slopes in the southern part of the reserve.
 Brittle gum - broad-leaved peppermint - Poa grass forestThis ecosystem exists on moderately exposed, east-facing slopes.
 Norton's box - Poa grass forestThis ecosystem exists on west-facing slopes in the south of the reserve.
 River she-oak forestThis ecosystem exists along Wee Jasper Creek in the south of the reserve.

Threatened species
The Australian anchor plant (Discharia pubescens) and limestone brittle-moss (Orthotrichum cupulatum) are rare. The Yass daisy (Ammobium craspedioides) is listed as vulnerable under the Threatened Species Conservation Act 1995 (NSW) (TSCA 1995). The Wee Jasper grevillea (Grevillea iaspicula) and the formbe pepper-cress (Lepidium pseudopapillosum) are listed as endangered under the TSCA 1995.

Fauna
60 species of animal have been identified in the reserve.

See also

 Protected areas of New South Wales

References

Nature reserves in New South Wales
Southern Tablelands
1979 establishments in Australia
Protected areas established in 1979